The Landesliga Braunschweig, called the Bezirksoberliga Braunschweig from 1979 to 1994 and 2006 to 2010, is the sixth tier of the German football league system and the second highest league in the German state of Lower Saxony (German: Niedersachsen). It covers the region of the now defunct Regierungsbezirk Braunschweig. 

It is one of four leagues at this level in Lower Saxony, the other three being the Landesliga Lüneburg, the Landesliga Weser-Ems and the Landesliga Hannover.

The term Landesliga can be translated as State league.

Overview

The league's history goes back to 1979, when four new Bezirksoberligas (Braunschweig, Hannover, Lüneburg and Weser-Ems) were formed in the state of Lower Saxony. The Bezirksoberligas (6th tier) were set below the Verbandsliga Niedersachsen (4th tier) and the two Landesligas (5th tier) in the German football league system. In 1994, the two old Landesligas were dissolved, while the four Bezirksoberligas were renamed into Landesliga Braunschweig, Landesliga Hannover, Landesliga Lüneburg, and Landesliga Weser-Ems respectively. Due to the introduction of the new Regionalliga (IV) the new Landesligas still remained at the 6th tier of German football, however.

In 2006, the Landesliga was renamed into Bezirksoberliga again. The new Bezirksoberliga Braunschweig was made up of fifteen clubs, two from the Verbandsliga Niedersachsen-Ost, eleven from the Landesliga and one from the two Bezirksligas each. The league was formed in a reorganisation of the league system in Lower Saxony, whereby the four regional Landsligas were replaced by the Bezirksoberligas. Below these, the number of Bezirksligas was increased. In Braunschweig, the two Bezirksligas were expanded to four, as in the other regions, except Weser-Ems, which was expanded to five.

The Bezirksoberliga, like the Landesliga before, was set in the league system below the Verbandsliga and above the now four Bezirksligas, which were numbered from one to four. The winner of the Bezirksoberliga was directly promoted to the Verbandsliga, while the bottom placed teams, in a varying number, were relegated to the Bezirksliga. The Bezirksoberligas of Weser-Ems and Hannover form the tier below the Verbandsliga West, while those of Lüneburg and Braunschweig form the tier below the eastern division of the Verbandsliga.

In the leagues first season, 2006–07, the runners-up of the league, SCW Göttingen, was also promoted, like the runners-up from Lüneburg. In the following season, only the league champions were promoted while, in 2009, Lupo Martini Wolfsburg moved up a level as runners-up.

At the end of the 2007-08 season, with the introduction of the 3. Liga, the Verbandsliga was renamed Oberliga Niedersachsen-Ost. For the Bezirksoberliga, this had no direct consequences.

After the 2009-10 season, the two Oberligas in Lower Saxony were merged to one single division. The four Bezirksoberliga champions that season were not be automatically promoted, instead they had to compete with the four teams placed ninth and tenth in the Oberliga for four more spots in this league.

On 17 May 2010, the Lower Saxony football association decided to rename the four Bezirksoberligas to Landesligas from 1 July 2010. This change in name came alongside the merger of the two Oberliga divisions above it into the Oberliga Niedersachsen.

Champions
The league champions of the Bezirksoberliga and Landesliga Braunschweig since 1979:

Bezirksoberliga Braunschweig 1979–1994

Landesliga Braunschweig 1994–2006

Bezirksoberliga Braunschweig 2006–2010

Landesliga Braunschweig 2010–present

 Promoted teams in bold.

References

Sources
 Deutschlands Fußball in Zahlen,  An annual publication with tables and results from the Bundesliga to Verbandsliga/Landesliga. DSFS.
 Kicker Almanach,  The yearbook on German football from Bundesliga to Oberliga, since 1937. Kicker Sports Magazine.
 Die Deutsche Liga-Chronik 1945-2005  History of German football from 1945 to 2005 in tables. DSFS. 2006.

External links 
 Das deutsche Fussball Archiv  Historic German league tables
 The Lower Saxony Football Association (NFV)  

Braunschweig
Football competitions in Lower Saxony
1979 establishments in West Germany
Sports leagues established in 1979
Sport in Braunschweig